Cai Xiao (October 1919 – 11 January 1990) was a Taiwan-born Chinese military officer and politician.

Born in Tainan when Taiwan was under Japanese rule, Cai moved to China and joined the New Fourth Army in 1937. Two years later, he became a formal member of the Chinese Communist Party. In May 1946, the CCP established the Taiwan Provincial Work Committee. Cai Xiao worked under the commission's secretary-general , training others in political warfare. In November 1949, Cai established the Taiwan Cadre Training Regiment under the 9th Corps of the People's Liberation Army's (PLA) Third Field Army. Later, he was assigned to train members of the PLA Air Force. Cai was jailed for nine years in the midst of the Cultural Revolution. Upon his political rehabilitation, Cai worked for the PLA General Political Department and General Logistics Department, becoming the GPD's deputy director in 1975. From 1973 to 1982, he served on the Central Committee of the Chinese Communist Party. After retiring from the military, Cai succeeded Xie Xuehong as chairman of the Taiwan Democratic Self-Government League (Taimeng), serving from 1979 to 1983.

In December 2017, Cai Xiao's daughter Su Hui was elected chair of Taimeng.

References

1919 births
1990 deaths
Chinese Communist Party politicians
Politicians from Tainan
Taiwanese emigrants to China
People's Liberation Army General Logistics Department
Deputy chiefs of the People's Liberation Army General Political Department
New Fourth Army
Members of the Taiwan Democratic Self-Government League
Leaders of political parties in China
Victims of the Cultural Revolution
Members of the Standing Committee of the 5th Chinese People's Political Consultative Conference
Members of the Standing Committee of the 6th Chinese People's Political Consultative Conference